Bellevueplatz ("Bellevue Square", from the French bellevue meaning "beautiful sight") is a town square in Zürich, Switzerland built in 1856. Named after the former Grandhotel Bellevue on its north side, it is one of the nodal points for roads and public transportation in Zürich, as well as an extension of the quaysides in Zürich that were built between 1881 and 1887.

Geography
Bellevue is situated next to the much larger Sechseläutenplatz (Sechseläuten Square) to the south of Bellevue. To the east is the Quaibrücke (Quay Bridge) on the Lake Zürich shore, next to the outflow of the lake into the Limmat. To the north is the Limmatquai, a street running along the riverbank. To the west is Utoquai, a lakefront quay. The square is bound by the streets Theaterstrasse to the east, Rämistrasse to north, and the Schoeckstrasse to the south.

Transportation 
The square is one of the nodal points of Zürich tram lines 2, 4, 5, 8, 9, 11 and 15, as well the regional bus lines 912 and 916, being the border between Rathaus and Hochschulen quarters. The square was not used in the classical sense as a public square for recreation until the adjoining Sechseläutenplatz was rebuilt in 2013 for public use.

Points of interest 
In addition to the Sechseläutenplatz and quaysides, there is also Café Odeon, where writers and the Zürich Bohème would meet, the Kronenhalle and Vorderer Sternen restaurants, and the Limmatquai and other attractions downstream along the Limmat.

In the historic tram stop building, there are two snack bars and a kiosk, a public toilet ZüriWC, and the ticket store of the Zürcher Verkehrsverbund (ZVV) public transportation company.

History 
Located on what was once swampland between the Limmat and Lake Zürich, prehistoric pile dwellings around Lake Zürich were discovered dating to the Neolithic and Bronze Age. They were built on small islands and peninsulas and set on piles to protect against occasional flooding by the Linth and Jona. Zürich–Enge Alpenquai is located on the Lake Zürich lakeshore in Enge, a locality of the municipality of Zürich. It was neighbored by similar settlements at Kleiner Hafner and Grosser Hafner on what was then a peninsula in the effluence of the lake, within an area of about  within the present city of Zürich. The settlement sites are listed on the UNESCO World Heritage Site Prehistoric pile dwellings around the Alps, and in the Swiss inventory of cultural property of national and regional significance as a Class object.

From 1558 to 1562 the round Auf Dorf bastion with battlements was built at the site of the present Bellevueplatz at the junction of Limmatquai and Rämistrasse. Structurally, it was connected to the Langenöhrlisturm of the city fortification, and was originally surrounded almost entirely by the water of Lake Zürich. The bulwark comprised casemates with loopholes and a platform for artillery to defend against attackers on the lake. It complemented the Bauschänzli bastion on the western side of the Limmat, and the medieval Grendeltor, a river gate and customs station that stood on the site of Haus Bellevue. Around 1700, after the construction of embankments, the bulwark lost its original function. Equipped with a solid roof, the area served as a salt house. Until 1795 the construction of a new seawall was carried out, and at the Kohlepörtli gate, goods were transhipped between Lake Zürich and Limmat. Remains from the c. 1830 demolition were discovered on occasion of road works in March 2015.

First mentioned in 1863, the square was named after the hotel Bellevue, which was built at Limmatquai 1 in 1856.

In mid-October 1937, Hermann Herter's design for the Bellevue-Rondell, to replace an old station concourse, was under construction at the square. While the heavy iron canopy was being raised a hoist broke and a worker fell to the ground with the structure. There were no injuries.

Despite the official name Bellevueplatz, it is often dubbed by the locals as das Bellevue, and is now one of the most important transport hubs in the city, for public transport as well as road traffic. Like the Bürkliplatz square on the opposite side of the Quaibrücke, Bellevueplatz is used for Sechseläuten and other public festivals, so traffic operations have to be stopped several times each year.

Renewal 
Bellevueplatz was renovated between March and 25 October 2015, with minor corrections in November 2015, during which the tram lines were redirected from June to mid-August. The edges of the tram tracks are designed to not cause obstruction, and the tracks at Rämistrasse between Café Odeon and Quaibrücke were rearranged and separated from bicycle lanes. As part of the road renewal works, the pedestrian crossings from Bellevue to Utoquai and from Sechseläutenplatz to Utoquai have been provided with a protective island that is tactilely detectable for visually impaired people.

See also 
 Limmatquai
 Prehistoric pile dwellings around Lake Zürich
 Sechseläutenplatz

References 

Altstadt (Zürich)
Squares in Zürich